The 1998 Berlin Marathon was the 25th running of the annual marathon race held in Berlin, Germany, held on 20 September 1998. Brazil's Ronaldo da Costa won the men's race in 2:06:05 hours, while the women's race was won by Belgian Marleen Renders in 2:25:22. Costa, running only for the second time over the distance, lowered the men's marathon world record by 45 seconds and performed a cartwheel in celebration at the finish line.

Results

Men

Women

References 

 Results. Association of Road Racing Statisticians. Retrieved 2020-04-02.

External links 
 Official website

1998 in Berlin
Berlin Marathon
Berlin Marathon
Berlin Marathon
Berlin Marathon